The Council of Government of Luxembourg consists of the Prime Minister and a number of ministers.

It was created by Grand Ducal decree on 29 August 1846, as the administrator of the country: "The Council of Government administers the country , while complying with laws and regulations (...) The administration of the country being entrusted to the Council of Government, every measure and administrative decision emanates from it, excepting the authorisation or approval of the Grand Duke, in cases determined by the laws and regulations."

It meets on a weekly basis to discuss bills to propose to the Chamber of Deputies. It is obliged to deliberate as a group on matters to be submitted to the Grand Duke.

Its decisions are taken by a majority of votes. In case of an even split, the Prime Minister has the casting vote.

All members of the government are responsible for every decision taken by the Council of Government which they agreed with. However, if a minister who makes their disagreement known in the minutes of a Council of Government meeting, they may be freed from their responsibility.

Size and titles 
The Constitution of 1868 did not put a limit on the number of members of the government, nor did it provide a title for them. It gave the Grand Duke the freedom to create ministries and to divide up departments according to his needs. In the 19th century and up until the 1930s, the government generally consisted of the Prime Minister and three "administrators-general", or from 1857, "directors-general". The decree of 24 March 1936 changed their titles to "ministers". The growth in the number of ministers came about after the Second World War, when the National Union Government was formed. After this, the government's number of ministers increased in parallel with the growth of the State's scope of activities, and Luxembourg's integration in international politics. At the beginning of the 2009-2013 legislature, the government was composed of 15 ministers.

Footnotes 

Government of Luxembourg
Luxembourg